Ludovico Vaccari (born Roma, 10 March 1998) is an Italian rugby union player.
His usual position is as a Centre and he currently plays for Fiamme Oro in Top12. 

For 2019–20 Pro14 season, he named like Permit Player for Zebre in Pro 14.

In 2017, Vaccari was named in the Italy Under 20 squad.

References

External links
Rugby Pass Profile
It's Rugby France

Italian rugby union players
1998 births
Living people
Rugby union centres